The Baroque Churches of the Philippines are a collection of four Spanish Colonial-era baroque churches in the Philippines, which were included in UNESCO's World Heritage List in 1993. The churches are also considered as national cultural treasures of the country.

World Heritage Site 677
The 2013 revision of UNESCO's World Heritage Site (WHS) 677, Baroque Churches of the Philippines.

Historical Context
There was a conglomeration of factors that led to the presence of Baroque elements in the architecture of the Philippines, specifically in church architecture. During the Spanish Colonial Period (1521–1898), Spanish missionaries arrived, sharing not only their religion but also their architecture, inspired from their native land. The Spaniards wished to create permanent, long-lasting churches as a testament to the power of God, and did not consider the current church structures in the Philippines as proper places to worship. As most Spanish missionaries were not trained in architecture or engineering, the local townspeople including Filipinos and Chinese migrants, alongside the Spanish friars would take part in the building and design of local churches. The combination of ideas from the missionaries and locals effectively fused native Spanish designs with a uniquely Oriental style. The church's aesthetic was also shaped by limited access to certain materials, and the need to rebuild and adapt to natural disasters including fires and earthquakes, creating a style sometimes referred to as Earthquake Baroque. The Baroque Churches of the Philippines is a serial inscription consisting of four Roman Catholic churches constructed between the 16th and the 18th centuries in the Spanish period of the Philippines. They are located in separate areas of the Philippine archipelago, two at the northern island of Luzon, one at the heart of Intramuros, Manila, and the other in the central Visayas island of Iloilo.

The four baroque churches of the Philippines are classified as UNESCO world heritage sites as they have important cultural significance and influence on future architectural design in the Philippines. The churches display certain characteristics that express a ‘fortress baroque,' such as thick walls and high facades that offer protection from marauders and natural disasters alike. The group of churches established a style of building and design that was adapted to the physical conditions in the Philippines which had an important influence on later church architecture in the region.

The four churches further exemplify the baroque style with elaborate iconography and detailed scenes from the life of Christ, fusing traditional Catholic values from Spain with island elements such as palm fronds or patron saints dressed in traditional island clothing carved alongside scenes from the bible. The lavish embellishment also reflects the Filipino attitude about the aesthetic of decorating, known as horror vacui, or ‘fear of empty spaces.’ The desire to fill plain spaces is evident in the decoration of the churches, which are brimming with cultural motifs from the western world along with traditional Filipino elements.

San Agustin Church in Manila
File:San agustin facade.jpg|thumb|San Agustin Church (Manila)
The San Agustin Church (Manila)|San Agustin Church in Manila, also known as The Church of the Immaculate Conception of San Agustín was the first church built on the island of Luzon in 1571, immediately after the Spanish occupation of the Philippines|Spanish conquest of Manila. A site within the district of Intramuros was assigned to the Augustinian Order, the first to evangelize in the Philippines. In 1587 the impermanent earliest building in wood and palm fronds was replaced by a stone church and monastery in stone, the latter becoming the Augustinian mother house in the Philippines.The Baroque Churches of the Philippines consists of 4 churches built during the Spanish colonial era in the late 16th century – San Agustin Church in Manila, San Agustin Church in Paoay, Ilocos Norte, Nuestra Señora de la Asuncion in Santa Maria, Ilocos Sur, and Santo Tomas de Villanueva Church in Iloilo.

Miag-ao became an independent parish in 1731, when a simple church and convento were built. However, destruction of the town by Muslim pirates in 1741 and 1754 led to the town being rebuilt in a more secure location. The new church, constructed in 1787–97, was built as a fortress, to withstand further incursions.as, however, damaged severely by fire during the revolution against Spain in 1898 and in the Second World War. Two bell towers were added in 1854, but the northern one cracked in the 1880 earthquake and had to be demolished. Because of the danger of natural disasters, much of the church's aesthetic had to be sacrificed in favor of durability and functionality. The church's age of more than 400 years, it has become a witness to many significant events in Philippine history during the Spanish period. In 1762, during the Seven Years War, British forces looted the church. In 1898, San Agustin Church Manila became a venue for American and Spaniards to discuss and sign the surrender of Manila to the Americans.

The interior of the church featured artwork dating back to the 19th century, with trompe-l'œil paintings by Italian painters Alberoni and Dibella, but they overlie the original tempera murals. The church was richly endowed, with a fine retablo, pulpit, lectern and choir-stalls. The church also includes oriental details in the form of Chinese fu dogs that flank the entrance of the building. Of special interest is the series of crypto-collateral chapels lining both sides of the nave. The walls separating them act as buttresses. The stone barrel vault, dome, and arched vestibule are all unique in the Philippines, as is the decor that often takes the shape of local flora. A monastery complex was formerly linked to the church by a series of cloisters, arcades, courtyards and gardens. The church was the only structure in Intramuros to survive the Liberation of Manila in 1945.

In the side chapel of the church rests the remains of Spanish Miguel Lopez de Legaspi, the founder of the city of Manila, which is the capital city of the Philippines.

Santa Maria Church
The Santa Maria Church commonly known as the Church of Our Lady of the Assumption, is located in the municipality of Santa Maria, Ilocos Sur|Santa Maria, Ilocos SurR. Unlike other town churches in the Philippines, which conform to the Spanish architecture|Spanish tradition of sitting on the central plaza, the Church of Nuestra Señora de la Asuncion in Santa Maria with its Convento is on a hill surrounded by a defensive wall. Also unusual are the sitting of the Convento parallel to the facade of the church and that of the separate bell tower (characteristic of Philippine-Hispanic architecture) at the midpoint of the nave wall. This was dictated by the hill on which it is located.

The brick church follows the standard Philippine layout, with a monumental facade masking a straight roof-line covering a long rectangular building. It is alleged to be built on a solid raft as a precaution against earthquake damage. The walls are devoid of ornament but have delicately carved side entrances and strong buttresses

Santa Maria Church inscribed its name in the UNESCO world heritage sites on December 11, 1993, as a part of the four Baroque Churches in the Philippines.

Paoay Church 
The Paoay Church, also known as the Church of San Agustín, is located in Paoay, Ilocos Norte. It is the most outstanding example in the Philippines of an Earthquake Baroque style architecture. Fourteen buttresses are ranged along the lines of a giant volute supporting a smaller one and surmounted by pyramidal finials. A pair of buttresses at the midpoint of each nave wall have stairways for access to the roof. The lower part of the apse and most of the walls are constructed of coral stone blocks, the upper levels being finished in brick, but this order is reversed on the facade. The massive coral stone bell tower, which was added half a century after the church was completed, stands at some distance from the church, again as a protection against damage during earthquakes. Poay church was built of baked bricks, coral rocks, salbot (tree sap) and lumber, and has 24 carved massive buttresses for support. It is an architectural solution to the area's challenging, natural setting. Both sides of the nave are lined with the most voluminous stone buttresses seen around the islands. Large coral stones were used for the lower level while bricks were used for the upper levels of the church. The walls are 1.67 meters thick made of the same materials. The detached bell tower is of notable interest as the tapering layers emphasizes the oriental style, a unique structure that reflects the design of a pagoda.  The church's exterior is made of coral stone and brick, held together by a mortar made from sugarcane juice, mango leaves, and rice straw among other ingredients. The facade of the church also has hints of a Gothic flavor with pilasters that extend from top to bottom, creating a strong vertical movement. While the exterior is decorated with rosettes and floral motifs that are reminiscent of Javanese temples, the interior is rather bare and solemn in comparison. Originally painted, the interior roof of the church today only shows an echo of the grand scenes that once graced the ceiling.

Miagao Church

The Miagao Church, also known as the Church of Santo Tomas de Villanueva, stands on the

highest point in the town of Miagao, Iloilo. The church's towers served as lookouts against Muslim raids and it is said to be the finest surviving example of 'Fortress Baroque'. The sumptuous facade epitomizes the Filipino transfiguration of western decorative elements, with the figure of St Christopher on the pediment dressed in native clothes, carrying the Christ Child on his back, and holding on to a coconut palm for support. The entire riotously decorated facade is flanked by massive tapering bell towers of unequal heights. The two bell towers are asymmetrical on account of them being designed by two priests on two occasions. The interior of the church features a grand altar, thought to be the original 1700s altar that was lost in a fire, but recovered in 1982. The altar is gilded with Baroque motifs, and composed of three alcoves that hold effigies of St. Thomas of Villanova and St. Joseph, with the crucifixion in the center.

Threats

The Binondo-Intramuros bridge was completed in 2022. Although the bridge is about 550 meters away San Agustin Church, it may have encroached on the buffer zone prescribed for the church, which includes the walls of Intramuros and the immediate areas outside. If San Agustin is going to be delisted from UNESCO's World Heritage List, three other churches across the Philippines — Paoay Church in Ilocos Norte, Santa Maria Church in Ilocos and Miag-ao Church in Iloilo — would also be delisted. The 4 churches were collectively included in the heritage list in 1993.

Other sites, nominations and programs

Aside from the churches included in World Heritage Site 677, another church which is inscribed in the UNESCO World Heritage List is the Vigan Cathedral, included in Historic City of Vigan (WHS 502rev).

The Philippines, a country with hundreds of historical churches, is promoted to be more active in the engagement of the National Government and concerned private and public entities to establish more UNESCO designated Church Heritage Sites in the Philippines to safeguard national treasures more effectively and to promote the country's booming tourism further.

Extensions proposed for World Heritage Site 677

Tentative sites

The current official tentative sites for extension are the following:
 Loboc Church of Loboc, Bohol (was also a part of the former Jesuit Churches of the Philippines nomination)
 Boljoon Church of Boljoon, Cebu
 Guiuan Church of Guiuan, Eastern Samar (was also part of the former Jesuit Churches of the Philippines nomination)
 Tumauini Church of Tumauini, Isabela
 Lazi Church of Lazi, Siquijor

Former tentative sites
The following churches used to be in the tentative list of the Philippines but were removed in 2015 by recommendation of UNESCO due to the current status of the churches. Once rehabilitation is completed for all of the churches, they may again be included in the tentative list. Currently, the San Sebastian Church has ongoing renovations.
 Baclayon Church of Baclayon, Bohol (as a part of the former Jesuit Churches of the Philippines nomination)
 Maragondon Church of Maragondon, Cavite (as a part of the former Jesuit Churches of the Philippines nomination)
 San Sebastian Church in Manila (as a single nomination)

National Cultural Treasures 
The Philippine National Commission for Culture and the Arts (NCCA) has also designated the conservation and protection of more than 30 other Spanish-era churches to be of utmost importance. These were registered as National Cultural Treasures.

These churches were given priority status not just due to their historical value, but also based on the geographic representation of various regions across the nation:

 Parish Church of San Agustin in Bacong, Negros Oriental
 Parish Church of the Immaculate Conception in Balayan, Batangas
 Santiago Apostol Parish Church in Betis, Guagua, Pampanga
 Parish Church of Patrocinio de Maria in Boljoon, Cebu 2
 Parish Church of Saint Rose of Lima in Gamu, Isabela
 Parish Church of Saints Peter and Paul in Calasiao, Pangasinan
 Parish Church of San Vicente de Ferrer in Dupax del Sur, Nueva Vizcaya
 Parish Church of the Immaculate Conception in Guiuan, Eastern Samar 1,2 
 Parish Church of Saints Peter and Paul in Tuguegarao City, Cagayan
 Parish Church of the Immaculate Conception in Jasaan, Misamis Oriental
 Parish Church of San Juan Bautista in Jimenez, Misamis Occidental
 Parish Church of San Isidro Labrador in Lazi, Siquijor 2
 Parish Church of San Pedro and San Pablo in Loboc, Bohol 1,2
 Parish Church of Santa Catalina de Alejandria in Luna, La Union
 Parish Church of San Carlos Borromeo in Mahatao, Batanes 
 Parish Church of San Guillermo de Aquitania in Magsingal, Ilocos Sur
 Parish Church of San Gregorio Magno in Majayjay, Laguna
 Parish Church of the Assumption of Our Lady in Maragondon, Cavite 1
 Parish Church of San Andres Apostol in Masinloc, Zambales
 Parish Church of Santa Monica in Panay, Capiz
 Cathedral of San Jose in Romblon, Romblon
 Parish Church of San Joaquin in San Joaquin, Iloilo
 Parish Church of San Juan Bautista in Tabaco City, Albay
 Parish Church of San Ildefonso in Tanay, Rizal
 Parish Church of San Pablo in San Pablo, Isabela
 Basilica of St Michael the Archangel in Tayabas, Quezon
 Parish Church of Santa Catalina de Alejandria in Tayum, Abra
 Parish Church of San Matias in Tumauini, Isabela 2
 Parish Church of Santa Cruz in Maribojoc, Bohol
 Parish Church of San Andres Apostol in Bacarra, Ilocos Norte
 Camarin de la Virgen, Parish Church of Nuestra Sra. De los Desamparados in Sta. Ana, Manila
 Parish Church of Our Lady of the Gate (Eastern & Western Facades, Belfry and Baptistry) in Daraga, Albay
 Parish Church of Our Lady of Light in Loon, Bohol
 Parish Church of Santa Monica in Minalin, Pampanga
 Parish Church of San Nicolas de Tolentino  in Dimiao, Bohol

Important Cultural Properties 
 Parish of the Holy Sacrifice in UP Diliman, Quezon City 
 San Agustin Church (Lubao) in Lubao, Pampanga
 Our Lady of Assumption Church (Bulakan) in Bulakan, Bulacan

National Historical Landmarks 
 Abucay Church Historical Landmark in Abucay, Bataan
 Barasoain Church Historical Landmark in Malolos, Bulacan
 Church of Baler Historical Landmark in Baler, Aurora
 Lubao Church Historical Landmark in Lubao, Pampanga
 Chapel of the Holy Sacrifice in UP Diliman, Quezon City
 San Sebastian Church Historical Landmark in Quiapo, Manila
 Calamba Church Historical Landmark in Calamba, Laguna
 Church of Paete in Paete, Laguna
 Taal Church Historical Landmark in Taal, Batangas
 Cathedral of Boac Historical Landmark in Boac, Marinduque
 Quipayo Church Historical Landmark in Calabanga, Camarines Sur
 Barotac Nuevo Church, Convent and Cemetery Historical Landmark in Barotac Nuevo, Iloilo
 Dumangas Church Historical Landmark in Dumangas, Iloilo
 Ermita Chapel Historical Landmark in Dumangas, Iloilo
 Jaro Belfry Historical Landmark in Jaro, Iloilo City
 Molo Church Historical Landmark in Molo, Iloilo City
 Baclayon Church Historical Landmark in Baclayon, Bohol 1
 Church and Convent of Santo Niño in Cebu City
 Church of Nuestra Señora de la Concepcion Historical Landmark in Argao, Cebu
 Church of San Guillermo de Aquitania Historical Landmark in Dalaguete, Cebu
 Church of the Most Holy Trinity - Historical Landmark in Loay, Bohol
 Maasin Church in Maasin City, Southern Leyte
 Church of Our Lady of Assumption - Historical Landmark in Dauis, Bohol

1 On August 15, 1993, these churches, along with the one in Baclayon, Bohol were nominated for World Heritage Site status as part of the Jesuit Churches of the Philippines.2 On May 16, 2006, the NCCA nominated a new set of churches as part of the extension of the Baroque Churches of the Philippines World Heritage Site. With the inclusion of two churches from the Jesuit Churches nomination, these two proposals will likely be combined.

See also
Church architecture
Baroque architecture
Spanish Colonial architecture
Churrigueresque
Architecture of the Philippines

 Earthquake Baroque
 List of ruined churches in the Philippines

References

External links
 Unesco.org: World Heritage Baroque Churches of the Philippines profile
 Ncca.gov.ph: NCCA profile of the 26 Baroque Churches of the Philippines
 Nomination of Jesuit Churches of the Philippines as a World Heritage Site
 Nomination for the Extension of the Baroque Churches as a World Heritage Site

 01
.
.
.
National Cultural Treasures of the Philippines
World Heritage Tentative List for the Philippines
World Heritage Sites in the Philippines